The Brunswick River in North Carolina runs for 6.2 miles along the west bank of Eagle Island near the city of Leland.  The Brunswick River is a fork of the Cape Fear River; the river starts as an offshoot of the Cape Fear River at the town of Navassa and flows back into the Cape Fear River at  the southern tip of Eagle Island.  Mill Creek and Alligator Creek flow into the Brunswick River.

References 
 Town of Leland
 Town of Navassa
 https://web.archive.org/web/20101031063136/http://www.ncsu.edu/paddletrails/southerncoast/sc10.html

Rivers of North Carolina
Rivers of Brunswick County, North Carolina
Tributaries of the Cape Fear River